The 2018 Princeton Tigers football team represented Princeton University in the 2018 NCAA Division I FCS football season. They were led by ninth-year head coach Bob Surace and played their home games at Powers Field at Princeton Stadium. Princeton was a member of the Ivy League. They finished the season 10–0 overall and 7–0 in Ivy League play to win the Ivy League title. Princeton averaged 6,561 fans per game.

Previous season
The Tigers finished the 2017 season 5–5, 2–5 in Ivy League play to finish in seventh place.

Preseason

Award watch lists

Schedule

Game summaries

at Butler

Monmouth

at Columbia

Lehigh

Brown

at Harvard

Cornell

Dartmouth

at Yale

at Penn

Ranking movements

References

Princeton
Princeton Tigers football seasons
Ivy League football champion seasons
College football undefeated seasons
Princeton Tigers football